Rho Fiera is a station on Line 1 of the Milan Metro in Rho, Lombardy, Italy. It was opened on 14 September 2005 as a one-station extension from Molino Dorino; Pero station was only added on 19 December 2005.
The station provides service to the FieraMilano exhibitition centre and is the current western terminus of the line. It is the westernmost station on the network. The station is outside the urban area of Milan. There is a special ticket, single or return, available for people travelling from Milan in order to visit the exhibitition centre by way of Rho Fiera station.

See also 
 Rho Fiera railway station

References

Line 1 (Milan Metro) stations
Railway stations opened in 2005
2005 establishments in Italy
Rho
Railway stations in Italy opened in the 21st century